William Nelson may refer to:

 Billy Nelson (athlete) (William Andrew Nelson, born 1984), American steeplechaser
 William Nelson (governor) (1711–1772), American colonial governor of Virginia 

 William Nelson (British judge) (born c. 1981), British district judge
 William Nelson (MP) (c. 1462–1525), member of parliament for the City of York
 William Nelson (New York politician) (1784–1869), U.S. congressman for New York
 William Nelson (Wisconsin politician) (1839–1913), member of the Wisconsin State Senate
 William Nelson (wrestler), American wrestler who won a bronze medal at the 1904 Olympics
 William Nelson, 1st Earl Nelson (1757–1835), elder brother of Horatio Nelson, 1st Viscount Nelson
 William "Bull" Nelson (1824–1862), Union army general in the American Civil War
 William E. Nelson (died 1991), murdered by his wife Omaima Nelson
 William G. Nelson (fl. 1980s–2020s), American cancer researcher and professor
 William H. Nelson (born 1944), American businessman
 Harold Nelson (athlete) (William Harold Nelson, 1923–2011), New Zealand runner
 William L. Nelson (politician) (1875–1946), U.S. congressman for Missouri
 William L. Nelson (Medal of Honor) (1918–1943), World War II Medal of Honor recipient
 William Lambie Nelson (1807–1887), member of the Queensland Legislative Assembly
 William T. Nelson (1908–1994), U.S. Navy rear admiral
 William Rockhill Nelson (1841–1915), American journalist and publisher
 William Nelson (industrialist) (1843–1932), New Zealand farmer and industrialist
 William Nelson (inventor) (died 1903), American inventor killed by own invention

See also
 Bill Nelson (disambiguation)
 Willie Nelson (born 1933), American guitarist, songwriter and country singer
 Willie Nelson (boxer) (born 1987)
 Will Newton Nelson (1897-1953), American farmer and politician
 William Neilson (disambiguation)